The 2010 Hel van het Mergelland was the 37th edition of the Volta Limburg Classic cycle race and was held on 3 April 2010. The race started and finished in Eijsden. The race was won by Yann Huguet.

General classification

References

2010
2010 in road cycling
2010 in Dutch sport